Hovithal Sothü (born August 9, 1969), is an Indian Educationist from Nagaland and the present Project Director at Task Force For Music & Arts, Government of Nagaland.

Early life and education
Hovithal Sothü was born on August 9, 1969, in Viswema, Nagaland. He received his primary education from St. Joseph's School, Viswema and finished high school from Loyola School, Jakhama. Then, he went on to join the Kohima Science College to pursue his dreams of becoming a doctor where he completed his B.Sc.

Career
He found his first employment opportunity in the PWD Department and started his career as a peon on fixed pay. He went on to complete his M.Sc, after which, he was selected as a lecturer at Kohima Science College, Jotsoma.

He taught at Kohima Science College for a few decades until he chanced upon a vacant post for an associate professor under Home Department in the Nagaland Disaster Management Cell.

In between, he also managed to earn his doctorate. Over the years, he has been closely monitoring trainings on Nagaland Services Rules, Disciplinary Rules, Human Rights, Consumer Rights, Elections (for which, he is also the State Master Trainer), basic office procedures, motivation, leadership, etc and also Issues on duties of citizens and Rights and Welfare with People with Disability. He has also published papers in the National Institute of Disaster Management (NIDM) and Indian Landslides Journal.

Later on he went on to become the State Coordinator of Disaster Management Cell at the Administrative Training Institute (ATI).

Task Force For Music & Arts
At present, he is serving as the Project Director for Task Force For Music & Arts, Government of Nagaland

See also
 Task Force For Music & Arts
 Viswema

References

1969 births
Living people
Naga people
People from Viswema
People from Kohima
Indian educators